Aleksandr Yuryevich Laktionov (born 28 May 1986) is a football coach and a former midfielder from Russia. He is the manager of FC Rodina-2 Moscow.

Career
Laktionov started his career at Spartak Moscow in 2005. In 2006, he was sent on loan to FC Aktobe on Kazakhstan and he was a part of their squad in the 2006 CIS Cup. In July 2007 he signed for Latvian Virslīga club Liepājas Metalurgs on loan, playing five games in the 2007 season.

Personal life
His cousin Denis Laktionov was also a footballer who played for the Russia national team.

References

External links
 
 

1986 births
People from Novosibirsk Oblast
Living people
Russian footballers
FK Liepājas Metalurgs players
Expatriate footballers in Latvia
FC Spartak Moscow players
Russian expatriate footballers
Expatriate footballers in Kazakhstan
Russian expatriate sportspeople in Kazakhstan
FC Arsenal Tula players
Association football forwards
FC Baikal Irkutsk players
Russian football managers
FC Aktobe players
FC Tekstilshchik Ivanovo players
FC Veles Moscow players
FC Olimp-Dolgoprudny players
FC Sportakademklub Moscow players
Sportspeople from Novosibirsk Oblast